"A Lover's Complaint" is a narrative poem written by William Shakespeare, and published as part of the 1609 quarto of Shakespeare's Sonnets.  It was published by Thomas Thorpe.

"A Lover’s Complaint" is an example of the female-voiced complaint, which is frequently appended to sonnet sequences. Other examples include Samuel Daniel's "Complaint to Rosamund", which follows Daniel's Delia (1592), Thomas Lodge's "Complaint of Elstred", which follows Phillis (1593), Michael Drayton's "Matilda the Faire", which follows Ideas Mirrour (1594), and Richard Barnfield's "Cassandra", which follows The Affectionate Shepherd.

Form and content 
The poem consists of forty-seven seven-line stanzas written in the form known as rhyme royal (rhyme scheme ABABBCC), a metre identical to that of Shakespeare's longer narrative poem The Rape of Lucrece.

The poem begins with a description of a young woman weeping at the edge of a river, into which she throws torn-up letters, rings, and other tokens of love. An old man nearby approaches the woman and asks the reason for her sorrow. She responds by telling him of a former lover who pursued, seduced, and finally abandoned her. She recounts in detail the speech her lover gave to her which seduced her. She concludes her story by conceding that she would fall for the young man's false charms again:
O, that infected moisture of his eye,
O, that false fire which in his cheek so glowed,
O, that forc'd thunder from his heart did fly,
O, that sad breath his spungy lungs bestowed,
O, all that borrowed motion seeming owed,
Would yet again betray the fore-betray'd,
And new pervert a reconciled maid!

Authorship 

Few have questioned the authorship of the poem. Shakespeare's authorship was not questioned until the early 19th century, when Hazlitt expressed doubts. In 1917 Robertson suggested that the poem, and several plays, were written by Chapman. This idea was not widely accepted, and attributions based on general aesthetic impressions of a poem have since become less common among literary scholars. "A Lover's Complaint" contains words and forms not found elsewhere in Shakespeare, including archaisms and Latinisms. Edmond Malone called the poem "beautiful", and suggested that Shakespeare may have been trying to compete with Edmund Spenser. Critics have seen thematic parallels to situations in Shakespeare's All's Well That Ends Well and Measure for Measure. According to John Kerrigan in Motives of Woe, the poem may be regarded as an appropriate coda to the sonnets, with its narrative triangle of young woman, elderly man, and seductive suitor paralleling a similar triangle in the sonnets themselves. Stanley Wells and Paul Edmondson note that:

Shakespeare is widely accepted as the poems' author. This is supported by studies written by Kenneth Muir, Eliot Slater and MacDonald P. Jackson.

Alternative views 
One writer suggests that the author was an anonymous early Elizabethan poet.

In 2007 Brian Vickers, suggested the poem was written by John Davies of Hereford, an author of theological pamphlets. He details arguments for the non-Shakespearean nature of the poem and lists numerous verbal parallels between the "Complaint" and the known works of Davies: – such as 'What brest so cold that is not warmed heare' and 'What heart's so cold that is not set on fire'. On this evidence it was omitted from the 2007 RSC Complete Works. MacDonald P. Jackson, in his review of Vickers' book in the Review of English Studies, calls this omission a "mistake" and states that Vickers' evidence is "very meagre." Jackson adds:

Harold Love, in his The Times Literary Supplement review, has similar questions regarding Vickers' suggestion:

References

External links 

 A Lover's Complaint (1609) Full text.
 Annotated text.

Poetry by William Shakespeare
Love poems